Wu Chaomei (born ) is a Chinese female  track cyclist. She competed on the national team in the omnium event at the 2010 UCI Track Cycling World Championships.  He was the Individual Pursuit gold medalist at the 2009 Asian Cycling Championships, as well as being a member of the Chinese team pursuit team that brought her a second gold medal.

Major results
2009 
1st Asian Track Cycling Championships (Individual Pursuit)

2010 
3rd Asian Track Cycling Championships (Individual Pursuit)

2011 
3rd Asian Track Cycling Championships (Individual Pursuit)

2015 
3rd National Track Championships (Omnium)

References

External links
 Profile at cyclingarchives.com

1989 births
Living people
Chinese female cyclists
Place of birth missing (living people)
Cyclists at the 2010 Asian Games
Asian Games medalists in cycling
UCI Track Cycling World Champions (women)
Medalists at the 2010 Asian Games
Asian Games bronze medalists for China
Chinese track cyclists
21st-century Chinese women